In enzymology, a deoxyuridine phosphorylase is an enzyme that catalyzes the chemical reaction

2'-deoxyuridine + phosphate  uracil + 2-deoxy-alpha-D-ribose 1-phosphate

Thus, the two substrates of this enzyme are 2'-deoxyuridine and phosphate, whereas its two products are uracil and 2-deoxy-alpha-D-ribose 1-phosphate.

No enzyme is known to be specific for this reaction, hence the EC number originally assigned to this enzyme function (EC 2.4.2.23) was deleted by the IUBMB in 2013.

These enzymes belong to the family of glycosyltransferases, specifically the pentosyltransferases.  They participate in pyrimidine metabolism.

References

 
 

Enzymes of unknown structure
EC 2.4.2